Purveyor may refer to:
A seller of dry goods; see Grocery store#Early history
Purveyance, in the U.K. the right of the Crown to requisition goods and services for royal use